Ozili or Ojili is a village and a Mandal in Tirupati district in the state of Andhra Pradesh in India.

Transport 
National Highway 16 passes through the town, which connects Kolkata and Chennai. The Andhra Pradesh State Road Transport Corporation operates bus services from Ojili bus station

References 

Villages in Nellore district